Baron von Bullshit Rides Again is a live album by American rock band Modest Mouse. It was released on April 13, 2004, by Epic Records. Recorded at The Social in Orlando, Florida, during a string of shows between February 13 and February 15, 2004, the live performance was recorded by the band but not officially released; instead, only a small number of people could obtain a copy at the time by purchasing the album exclusively at Park Avenue CDs in Orlando.

Track listing
"3rd Planet" – 5:25
"Never Ending Math Equation" – 3:38
"Wild Packs of Family Dogs" – 1:59
"Broke" – 3:36
"Paper Thin Walls" – 4:51
"I Came as a Rat" – 6:24
"Doin' the Cockroach" – 7:30
"Bankrupt on Selling" – 3:04
"Interstate 8" – 4:01
"The Good Times Are Killing Me" – 5:00

References

Modest Mouse albums
2004 live albums
Epic Records live albums